Ancistrota is a genus of moths in the family Saturniidae first described by Jacob Hübner in 1819.

Species
Ancistrota plagia Hübner, 1819

References

Hemileucinae
Moth genera